Industrial and Commercial Bank of China Limited (ICBC) is a Chinese multinational bank.

Founded as a limited company on 1 January 1984, ICBC is a state-owned commercial bank. With capital provided by the Ministry of Finance of China, the bank's Tier 1 capital in 2013 was the largest of one thousand global banks, being the first bank headquartered in China to achieve this distinction in modern history. Subsequently, ranked the largest bank in the world 2017 and 2018, by total assets, (31 December 2020, US$4.324 trillion), ICBC was positioned at 1st in The Bankers Top 1000 World Banks ranking, every year from 2012, and first (2019) on the Forbes Global 2000 list of the world's biggest public companies. Furthermore, ICBC is considered one of the most profitable companies in the world, ranking fourth according to Forbes. It is considered a systemically important bank by the Financial Stability Board.

Several former employees of ICBC have moved on to work in prominent government positions in China. Notable ICBC alumni include Chairman of CSRC Huiman Yi, and Deputy Governor of PBoC Gongsheng Pan.

History

Preconditions of 1948–1979
From 1948 the mono-banking system of China was the People's Bank of China, providing both policy lending, and, operations to the commercial sector. During 1978 to 1979 banking reform was initiated by the government of China, with the express desire of bringing into existence a central bank accompanying four total central governmentally owned specializing banks, one of these four being ICBC.

1979–1985
A Two-Tier banking system was made.

1984–2005
By rights of a contradiction within the economic functioning of the government of China, the People's Republic, the State Council of China, during September of 1983 made a decision to separate certain activities of the government to an exclusively operating organisation, subsequently named the Industrial and Commercial bank of China, established on 1 January 1984. ICBC was then the fourth of the four specialist banks of 1978–1979 to be made, from the taking of control of commercial activities ("industrial credit and savings business") from People's Bank of China so that the latter might be transformed to a newly made central bank.

ICBC opened a branch in Luxembourg which became the European headquarters of the bank in 2011. ICBC (Europe) S.A. operates a network covering branches in major European cities, namely Paris, Amsterdam, Brussels, Milan, Madrid, Barcelona, Warsaw and Lisbon.

The bank's Hong Kong operations are listed under the name ICBC Asia. It has purchased the Hong Kong subsidiary of Fortis Bank and rebranded it under its own name on 10 October 2005.

In June 2005, ICBC Credit Suisse Asset Management Co., Ltd., a joint venture between ICBC (55%), Credit Suisse First Boston (25%) and COSCO (20%), was formally established in China. Subsequently ICBC acquired the 20% stake from COSCO and a 5% stake from CSFB.

2006–2008

Customer base
As of 2006, ICBC had 2.5 million corporate customers and 150 million individual customers.

IPO 
In the runup to its planned initial public offering, on 28 April 2006, three "strategic investors" injected US$3.7 billion into ICBC:

 Goldman Sachs purchased a 5.75% stake for US$2.6 billion, the largest sum Goldman Sachs has ever invested.
 Dresdner Bank (a wholly owned subsidiary of Commerzbank) invested US$1 billion.
 American Express invested US$200 million.

ICBC was simultaneously listed on both the Hong Kong Stock Exchange and Shanghai Stock Exchange on 27 October 2006. It was the world's largest IPO at that time valued at US$21.9 billion, surpassing the previous record US$18.4 billion IPO by Japan's NTT DoCoMo in 1998. In 2010, Agricultural Bank of China broke ICBC's IPO record when it raised $22.1 billion. China's largest commercial bank was also the first company to debut simultaneously on both the Hong Kong and Shanghai stock exchanges.

ICBC raised at least US$14 billion in Hong Kong (H-shares) and another US$5.1 billion in Shanghai (A-shares). Due to heavy subscriptions, the greenshoe (i.e. over-allotment) placements were exercised and ICBC's take rose to US$21.9 billion (17% of ICBC's market value before the IPO), divided in US$16 billion in Hong Kong and US$5.9 billion in Shanghai. Following the global offering, the free float of shares was 22.14% of the market capitalization.

At the end of its first day of trading, the bank's shares closed up almost 15% at HK$3.52 in Hong Kong, compared with the listing price of HK$3.07, which was set at the top of the indicative range due to the strong demand. According to Bloomberg, ICBC's market capitalisation at the end of trade based on its Hong Kong shares was US$156.3 billion, making its equity the world's fifth highest among banks, just behind JPMorgan Chase. Meanwhile, ICBC's Shanghai-listed A-shares recorded more modest gains and ended up 5.1% from the offering price of RMB 3.12.

During July 2007 ICBC was ranked 30th in the world in terms of revenue.

Foreign activity
In August 2008, ICBC became the second Chinese bank since 1991 to gain federal approval to establish a branch in New York City. ICBC had signed a lease with the Trump Organization for office space in the Trump Tower in 2008. ICBC was Trump Tower's largest office tenant as of 2012.

ICBC loans $400 million towards the completion of the Gibe III dam in Ethiopia. Groups that oppose the dam such as International Rivers and Survival International have complained about or have written to ICBC against the dam's funding.

2011– present

On 24 January 2011, ICBC opened a branch office in Madrid, Spain.

On 20 May 2011, Industrial and Commercial Bank of China Ltd. established two branches in Pakistan, one in Karachi, the other in Islamabad. On 18 August 2011, ICBC passed the examination from State Bank of Pakistan and started its business in Pakistan.

During November 2012, ICBC acquires a 80% stake (valued at $600 million) of Standard Bank Argentina, the largest operation of a Chinese bank in Latin America. In Argentina, the bank has ~1,000,000 individual customers, ~30,000 companies of all categories and more than 1600 corporate companies.

During the 2013 Korean crisis, the Industrial and Commercial Bank of China halted business with a North Korean bank accused by the United States of financing Pyongyang's missile and nuclear programs.

It was announced at the end of July 2013 that South Africa's Standard Bank was in talks to sell its markets business in London to the Industrial and Commercial Bank of China for more than $500 million.

On 24 September 2014, ICBC Kuwait Branch officially opened in Kuwait City, capital of Kuwait. As the first and currently the only Chinese bank in Kuwait, the establishment of ICBC Kuwait Branch ended the history of no Chinese bank's presence in Kuwait. Meanwhile, it is also the fourth branch of ICBC in the Middle East, following branches in Dubai, Abu Dhabi and Doha.

As of 2 December 2014, ICBC is ranked the largest bank in the world by assets and by tier 1 capital.

On 25 May 2015, the Company further strengthened its presence in the Middle East and Europe by purchasing Turkey's TekstilBank and forming its ICBC Turkey subsidiary.

On 17 February 2016, the Spanish Guardia Civil raided the offices of ICBC in Madrid, Spain, investigating suspicions of money laundering.

On 18 November 2016, the bank obtained a license to take deposits in Russia.

ICBC Financial Services, the bank's brokerage unit, provided about $88 billion of repo financing at the end of 2015, up from $59 billion two years ago, according to regulatory filings. The figures are before netting agreements that can be used to reduce overall assets and liabilities. Almost all the repo financing that ICBC provides is on U.S. government bonds.

ICBC launched robo-advisor service to its wealth-management operations in 2017.

In October 2017, the Bank reported a 3.3 percent rise in its net profit for the third quarter.

ICBC reported 10.3 pct growth in its profit along with exceptional growth in its revenue during the year 2021. This was caused by the gradual recovery of the Chinese economy after the Covid-19 pandemic.

Finances

Accounting
ICBC has the policy of preparing accounts conforming to the International Financial Reporting Standards, accepting specifically criteria IFRS 9 (pertains to the definition and rating of asset, liability, and a number of all of the existing purchasing contracts for non-financial purchases) from 1 January 2018. and IFRS 16 (pertaining to lease) from 1 January 2019.

Basic figures

2005
In 2005, net profit was up 12.4% to RMB 33.7 billion, and the total loan balance was RMB 3,289.5 billion. Total liabilities are RMB 6,196.2 billion, up 11.2%. Delinquent or non-performing loans (NPL) total RMB 154.4 billion, a significant reduction although the figures are widely regarded as being somewhat higher than officially stated. It has an NPL ratio of 4.69% and a capital adequacy ratio of 9.89%.

Summary

2003–2018
Financials in Renminbi

Loans

Listed to industry
In millions of Chinese RMB (Yuan) in 2005:
 Manufacturing: 662,376, 20.1% (28.7% in 2004)
 Transportation, storage, postage & telecommunications: 367,371, 11.2% (10.2% in 2004)
 Power, gas and water: 281,179, 8.6% (7.0% in 2004)
 Retail and wholesale, catering: 265,906, 8.1% (6.9% in 2004)
 Property development: 194,024, 5.9%, (5.6% in 2004)
 Social service organization: 103,070, 3.1%, (3.2% in 2004)
 Construction: 89,666, 2.7%, (2.1% in 2004)
 Other industries: 313,804, 9.5%, (12.1% in 2004)
 Discounted bills: 392,717, 11.9%, (8.4% in 2004)
 Personal loans: 515,042, 15.7%, (13.1% in 2004)
 Overseas business: 104,398, 3.2%, (2.7% in 2004)
Total: 3,289,553

With collateralization
 Secured by mortgages: 34.1%
 Secured by other collateral: 22.1%
 Guaranteed loans: 23.3%
 Unsecured loans: 20.5%

Non-performing
At the end of 2004, 19.1% of ICBC's portfolio consisted of non-performing loans. To clean up ICBC's balance sheet and prepare it for overseas listing, the Chinese government orchestrated a series of capital injections, asset transfers, and government-subsidised bad loan disposals that eventually cost more than US$162 billion. This included an approval for a cash injection of US$15 billion (financed from China's massive foreign exchange reserves) on 28 April 2005. The Beijing-based state company, China Huarong Asset Management, helped ICBC dispose of its bad loans. As the 2005 annual report records, just under 5% of loans are classified as non-performing, in comparison with the majority of western banks who have lower NPL ratios (US commercial banks are typically around 1%).

Board of directors
The company has 449,226 employees. There are 24 members of the board, with one chairmen, one supervisory board chairman and one vice-chairman.  Chen Siqing, the current chairman, assumed his role after resigning in April 2019 from Bank of China, where he was the chair, executive director and chairman and participating board member within the Strategic Development Committee. Siqing had no disagreement with the Board at the time of his resignation, made purely for the reason of vocational change to ICBC. Yi Huiman, the previous chairman, finished with the company to fulfil the position of chairman at the China Securities Regulatory Commission.

As of 17 May 2020, the board is as stands:
 Chen Siqing (陈四清), chairman of ICBC, former Bank of China chairman
 Gu Shu, president of ICBC
 Lu Yongzhen, former director on the National Development and Reform Commission
 Zheng Fuqing, former Ministry of Finance of the People's Republic of China official
 Mei Yingchun, former Ministry of Finance of the People's Republic of China and World Bank official
 Feng Weidong, former secretary of the Ministry of Finance of the People's Republic of China
 Cao Liqun, former State Administration of Foreign Exchange official
 Anthony Francis Neoh, former Hong Kong SEC chairman
 Yang Siu Shun, former chairman of PricewaterhouseCoopers Hong Kong
 Shen Si, former executive director of Shanghai Pudong Development Bank
 Nout Wellink, former president and chairman of De Nederlandsche Bank
 Fred Zuliu Hu, former IMF and World Economic Forum official

Environmental policy and record
In 2008 ICBC was the first Chinese Bank to adopt the Equator Principles, an international set of social and environmental standards for financial institutions launched in 2003. It has also adopted the Green Credit Policy launched in 2007 by the Chinese Ministry of Environmental Protection. International environmental groups have criticized ICBC for failing to adhere to its social environmental standards and of being hypocritical, because ICBC is involved in the financing of the controversial Gilgel Gibe III Dam in Ethiopia.

Subsidiaries

Domestic 

 ICBC Credit Suisse Asset Management Co., Ltd.

International 
 Industrial and Commercial Bank of China (Asia)
ICBC Standard Bank Plc
ICBC International Securities Limited
 Industrial and Commercial Bank of China (Canada)
 Industrial and Commercial Bank of China USA NA
 Industrial and Commercial Bank of China (Mexico)
 Industrial and Commercial Bank of China (Macau)
 Industrial and Commercial Bank of China (Thai)
 ICBC Turkey
 ICBC Argentina
 Industrial and Commercial Bank of China (Pakistan)
Industrial and Commercial Bank of China (Zurich)

Controversies

In 2005, the Chinese government arrested several government officials in addition to bankers with regards to the accusation of a scheme to take illegally US$900 million from ICBC.

In November 2015, ICBC Standard Bank, an overseas subsidiary acquired in February of that year, agreed to pay a fine of a maximum of $40 million to UK authorities.

On 17 February 2016, the Spanish Guardia Civil supported by Europol, arrested six executives of the Spanish location of the bank accused of money-laundering.

In 2018, the US Federal Reserve had found "serious deficiencies" of the bank, on, anti-money laundering protections.

On 12 August 2021, a former senior banker at Industrial and Commercial Bank of China, Gu Guoming was sentenced to life in jail by Chinese authorities, after being found guilty of bribery.

Awards
 Forbes Global 2000 – the World's Largest Public Company

References

Bibliography
Flora Xiao Huang, Horace Yeung (2019) Chinese Companies and the Hong Kong Stock Market, sub-heading 6.4.4, published by Routledge, 30 October 2013 ,

External links
 
 Financial Reports
  Industrial and Commercial Bank of China
 Industrial and Commercial Bank of China

 
2006 initial public offerings
Banks of China
Chinese brands
Chinese companies established in 1984
Banks established in 1984
Companies based in Beijing
Companies in the CSI 100 Index
Companies in the Hang Seng Index
Companies in the Hang Seng China Enterprises Index
Companies listed on the Hong Kong Stock Exchange
Companies listed on the Shanghai Stock Exchange
Government-owned companies of China
H shares
Multinational companies headquartered in China
Systemically important financial institutions